Archery is among the sports which is being contested at the 2019 South Asian Games. Archery is being hosted in the Pokhara Stadium between 5 and 9 December 2019.

Medal table

Medalists

Recurve

Compound

Participating nations
A total of 60 archers from five nations contested the archery competitions. Maldives did not enter any archers, while India was barred from competing because the Archery Association of India was suspended by World Archery. The amount of archers each nation entered is listed in parentheses beside the country's name.

References

External links
Official website

2019 South Asian Games
Events at the 2019 South Asian Games
2019
South Asian Games